John Herbert Sailhamer (October 17, 1946 – January 9, 2017) was an American professor of Old Testament studies at Golden Gate Baptist Theological Seminary in California. He was president of the Evangelical Theological Society in 2000 and made notable contributions to Old Testament studies.

Career 

After a B.A. at California State University, Long Beach, his Th.M. at Dallas Theological Seminary, and his M.A. and Ph.D. (1981) at University of California at Los Angeles, Sailhamer began his teaching career in 1975 at Biola University, then taught at Bethel Seminary, Trinity Evangelical Divinity School, Western Seminary (1995–98), Southeastern Baptist Theological Seminary (1999–2006), and at Golden Gate Baptist Theological Seminary beginning in 2006. He was briefly appointed as provost of Dallas Theological Seminary in 1993, but resigned before he was to begin serving in 1994.

Sailhamer served on the review and editorial teams for two recent Bible translations — the New Living Translation and the Holman Christian Standard Bible.

Sailhamer has published extensively on Old Testament matters, especially the Pentateuch. Sailhamer's latest publication, The Meaning of the Pentateuch (2009), has been called his magnum opus and briefly broke into Amazon.com's top 100 sellers. John Piper has heartily endorsed it saying, "There is nothing like it. It will rock your world. You will never read the 'Pentateuch' the same again."

Historical Creationism
In Genesis Unbound: A Provocative New Look at the Creation Account (1996), Sailhamer argues for a view of creationism that he labels as "Historical Creationism", which contends that the creation week in Genesis 1 is a record of the preparation of the Garden of Eden for Adam and Eve, not a record of the preparation of the whole planet Earth itself or the universe. This view, along with the book Genesis Unbound, has been endorsed by major evangelical pastors and theologians (particularly in the New Calvinist movement), such as Matt Chandler, Mark Driscoll, and John Piper.

Publications 
 Genesis: The Expositor's Bible Commentary (1990) with  Walter C. Kaiser Jr., Richard Hess, Tremper Longman III and David E. Garland  
 NIV Compact Bible Commentary (1999) 
 An Introduction to Old Testament Theology: A Canonical Approach  (1995) 
 The Pentateuch as Narrative: A Biblical-Theological Commentary (1995) 
 Biblical Prophecy (1998) 
 "Biblical Theology and the Composition of the Hebrew Bible", pp 25–37 in Biblical Theology: Retrospect and Prospect, edited by Scott J. Hafemann (2002) 
 "The Meaning of the Pentateuch: Revelation, Composition and Interpretation." (2009)

References

External links
 John Sailhamer's faculty bio from Golden Gate Baptist Theological Seminary
 The Writings of John Sailhamer (An Online Bibliography) (PDF)

1946 births
2017 deaths
Western Seminary
Old Testament scholars
California State University, Long Beach alumni
University of California, Los Angeles alumni
Dallas Theological Seminary alumni
Biola University faculty
Bethel University (Minnesota) faculty
Translators of the Bible into English
American biblical scholars
20th-century translators